The Our Lady of the Snows Parish Church formerly called as the Blood Chapel, also called Krisztina Church, is a Catholic Church located in the Krisztina Square, Krisztinaváros, Várkerület District (Buda Castle District), Budapest. It is a protected monument.

History 
During the late-17th century and early-18th century, the population of Buda was destroyed by plague epidemics. In 1694 Péter Pál Franczin, an Italian-born chimney sweeper, a modest citizen living in the Buda Castle District vowed that if he and his family escaped, he would travel to northern Italy (Valle Vigezzo) to the shrine of Mary, to Re, Piedmont for the Blessed Virgin Mary's image there. He returned from the pilgrimage with a copy of the grace image to Buda and erected a wooden chapel in his Buda vineyard. He placed the grace in what was then called the Blood Chapel. In a 1723 fire the chapel was burnt, but the grace image survived. The stone chapel, now rebuilt, became a place of pilgrimage; at first Jesuits, then Carmelites. In 1751 Queen Maria Theresa also visited the grace. In 1757 the Pope Benedict XIV contributed to the Feast of the Our Lady of the Snows in the Blood Chapel on 5 August.

The pastoral duties were performed from 1791 to 1821 by the Franciscans from the Buda Castle Parish. Due to the construction of Krisztinaváros, a larger church was needed, the foundation stone of which in 1795. It was laid down on September 13 and built over two years under the control of Franciscans father Groll Fábián and the plan of Kristóf Hikisch. Unfortunately, due to Hikisch's plans, the swirling shape of the façade could not be built without money. Instead, it has a tightly planed, relaxed façade. He also had a seat in the new church. (there are also two replicas of the grace image, the Church of the Queen of the Angels of Székesfehérvár and the Franciscan Church of Pest). The side altars (St. Anne, Painful Mother, Nepomuki, St. John and Mary Magdalene) were completed between 1811 and 1815. In 1821 the Our Lady of the Snows Parish Church became independent; its first parish priest was Jakab Majsch. During the Siege of the Buda Castle in 1849, the roof of the church was badly damaged. The errors were corrected by József Hild.

On 4 February 1836 the Count István Széchenyi held his wedding with Crescence Seilern in the Our Lady of the Snows Parish Church. and gave birth to their first child, Bela Széchenyi, he was baptized here on the first anniversary of their marriage on 3 February 1837. Loránd Eötvös was also baptized here on 5 August 1848, then 10 days of birth, and became the "prince of physicists". Also, the wedding of Dr. Ignaz Semmelweis and Mária Weidenhoffer was held here, on 1 June 1857, by the "savior of the mothers" . Between 1877 and 1978, the young János Csernoch, later cardinal, archbishop of the Kingdom of Hungary, assisted here for a year.

On 22 June 1919 József Cserny attacked a 50 red soldiers at the feast of Corpus Christi of the church, and fired more shots at them; Dr. Artúr Dénes was killed during the attack.

From 1956 György Czigány regularly performed in the church.

In 1993 the parish founded the Szent Gellért Catholic Elementary School, which in 1997 expanded to become a 12 grade school. In the space between the church and the gymnasium there is a copy of the oldest statue of the Immaculate Conception in Budapest (the original was transported to the Metropolitan Museum in 1927).

Gallery

References

External links

Official site of Our Lady of the Snows Parish Church (in Hungarian)

Várkerület
Roman Catholic churches in Budapest
Roman Catholic churches completed in 1815
19th-century Roman Catholic church buildings in Hungary